The Stone Jetty is a jetty in Morecambe, Lancashire, England. It was built by the North Western Railway in 1853 as a wharf and rail terminal for both passenger and cargo transport. The former station building with adjoining lighthouse stand on the jetty and are Grade II-listed. The jetty was resurfaced and partly rebuilt in the 1990s as part of coastal defence works, which was combined with the installation of public art and sculptures.

References

Buildings and structures in Morecambe
Piers in Lancashire
Morecambe Bay
Morecambe